Mighty Casey's was a fast food restaurant that started in Atlanta, Georgia in 1980. It was popular in the Atlanta metropolitan area for serving quality fast-food, generous helpings, and creative menu offerings. It was bought out by Krystal in 1994 and most of the restaurants were converted into Krystals.

The menu included offerings like :

 The "Grand Slam", a large hamburger with ham, swiss cheese and special sauce.  (can add lettuce, tomato and onion)
 Chopped Barbecue sandwich
 Cajun wings
 Hot dogs in almost any combination you can imagine. chili dog, slaw dog, cheese dog, chili slaw dog, chili cheese dog, Chili cheese slaw dog (Super Chili Dog)
 Orange shake (The Frosty Orange)
 Breakfast menu (Country Ham, sausage, bacon biscuits, biscuits and gravy)
 Onion Rings hand battered and made to order.
 Ice cream by Green Wood Ice Cream
 Beer on tap

Mighty Casey's set itself apart from other fast-food chains by offering higher quality menu options that featured more exclusive recipes and ingredients such as Wisconsin beef, signature sauces, and hand battered onion rings.

See also
 List of defunct fast-food restaurant chains

References
Customers tune in Mighty Casey's
Krystal inks deal for Mighty Casey's units

Defunct fast-food chains in the United States
Defunct restaurants in the United States
Restaurants in Georgia (U.S. state)
Defunct companies based in Georgia (U.S. state)
Restaurants established in 1980